

The Transdanubian Mountains (sometimes also referred to as Bakony Forest, Dunántúl Highlands, Highlands of Dunántúl, Highlands of Transdanubia, Mountains of Dunántúl, Mountains of Transdanubia, Transdanubian Central Range, Transdanubian Hills, Transdanubian Midmountains or Transdanubian Mid-Mountains) are a mountain range in Hungary covering about 7000 km2.

Parts of the mountains
Bakony
 Southern Bakony
 Northern Bakony
 Keszthely Plateau
Tapolca Basin
Balaton Uplands
Bakonyalja
Sokoró Hills
Vértes Mountains
Vértesalja (Bársonyos)
Velence Hills
Dunazug Mountains
Gerecse Mountains
Buda Hills
Pilis Mountains

Visegrád Mountains are often considered a part of it for geopolitical reasons, but geographically they are part of the North Hungarian Mountains.

Gallery

References

Sources 

 https://www.arcanum.hu/hu
 http://www.karpat-medence.hu (In Hungarian)

See also 

Transdanubia
Geography of Hungary
Pannonian island mountains

 
Highlands